
Gmina Gniew is an urban-rural gmina (administrative district) in Tczew County, Pomeranian Voivodeship, in northern Poland.

Villages
Apart from the town of Gniew, Gmina Gniew contains the villages and settlements of Aplinki, Brody, Ciepłe, Cierzpice, Dąbrówka, Gogolewo, Jaźwiska, Jeleń, Kolonia Ostrowicka, Kuchnia, Kursztyn, Mała Karczma, Nicponia, Opalenie, Ostrowite, Piaseckie Pola, Piaseczno, Pieniążkowo, Polskie Gronowo, Półwieś, Rakowiec, Stary Młyn, Szprudowo, Tymawa, Widlice, Wielkie Walichnowy, Wielkie Wyręby and Włosienica.

Neighbouring gminas
Gmina Gniew is bordered by the gminas of Kwidzyn, Morzeszczyn, Nowe, Pelplin, Ryjewo, Sadlinki, Smętowo Graniczne and Sztum.

References
Polish official population figures 2006

Gniew
Tczew County